The 2016 Internazionali di Tennis dell'Umbria is a professional tennis tournament played on clay courts. It is the 10th edition of the men's tournament which is part of the 2016 ATP Challenger Tour, offering a total of €42,500+H in prize money. The event will take place at the Tennis Club Todi in Todi, Italy, on 4 – 10 July 2016.

Singles main draw entrants

Seeds 

 1 Rankings as of 27 June 2016

Other entrants 
The following players received wildcards into the singles main draw:
  Federico Gaio
  Stefano Napolitano
  Gianluigi Quinzi
  Lorenzo Sonego

The following player received entry as an alternate:
  Daniil Medvedev

The following players received entry from the qualifying draw:
  Tomislav Brkić
  Salvatore Caruso
  Ramkumar Ramanathan
  Miljan Zekić

The following player received entry as a lucky loser:
  Cem İlkel

Champions

Singles 

  Miljan Zekić def.  Stefano Napolitano, 6–7(6–8), 6–4, 6–3

Doubles 

  Marcelo Demoliner /  Fabrício Neis def.  Salvatore Caruso /  Alessandro Giannessi, 6–1, 3–6, [10–5]

External links 
 Official website 

2016 ATP Challenger Tour
2016
2016 in Italian tennis